The Nature of Imitation is the third studio album by Austrian electronic musician and producer Oliver Thomas Johnson, under his stage name Dorian Concept. It was released on 3 August 2018 by Brainfeeder.

Critical reception

The Nature of Imitation was met with "generally favorable" reviews from critics. At Metacritic, which assigns a weighted average rating out of 100 to reviews from mainstream publications, this release received an average score of 78, based on 8 reviews. Aggregator Album of the Year gave the release a 74 out of 100 based on a critical consensus of 9 reviews.

Track listing

References

2018 albums
Brainfeeder albums